Warren Richard Roper FRS FRSNZ FNZIC (born 1938) is a New Zealand chemist and Emeritus Professor at the University of Auckland.

Roper was educated at Nelson College from 1952 to 1956, and was dux in his final year. He then studied chemistry at the University of Canterbury, and undertook his PhD under the supervision of CJ Wilkins. He completed his PhD in 1963, and spent three years undertaking postdoctoral research at the University of North Carolina in the United States before returning to New Zealand. At that point Roper was appointed as lecturer at the University of Auckland, where he remained until his retirement (apart from visiting lectureships at other institutions).

Roper's research has focused on synthetic and structural organometallic chemistry, and particularly compounds with metal-carbon, -silicon, -tin or -boron bonds. He was made a fellow of the Royal Society of New Zealand (RSNZ) in 1984, and a fellow of the Royal Society in 1989. The RSNZ awarded Roper the Hector Memorial Medal in 1991. He gave a valedictory address at the 2006 New Zealand Institute of Chemistry Conference in honour of his retirement.

Selected publications
 Irvine, Geoffrey J., MJ Gerald Lesley, Todd B. Marder, Nicholas C. Norman, Craig R. Rice, Edward G. Robins, Warren R. Roper, George R. Whittell, and L. James Wright. "Transition metal− boryl compounds: synthesis, reactivity, and structure." Chemical reviews 98, no. 8 (1998): 2685–2722.
 Gallop, Mark A., and Warren R. Roper. "Carbene and carbyne complexes of ruthenium, osmium, and iridium." Adv. Organomet. Chem 25 (1986): 121–198.
 Gallop, Mark A., and Warren R. Roper. "Carbene and carbyne complexes of ruthenium, osmium, and iridium." Adv. Organomet. Chem 25 (1986): 121–198.
 Brothers, Penelope J., and Warren R. Roper. "Transition-metal dihalocarbene complexes." Chemical Reviews 88, no. 7 (1988): 1293–1326.
 Hill, Anthony F., Warren R. Roper, Joyce M. Waters, and Anthony H. Wright. "A mononuclear, low-valent, electron-rich osmium methylene complex." Journal of the American Chemical Society 105, no. 18 (1983): 5939–5940.

References 

1938 births
New Zealand chemists
New Zealand Fellows of the Royal Society
University of Canterbury alumni
Fellows of the Royal Society of New Zealand
Living people
20th-century New Zealand scientists
21st-century New Zealand scientists
People educated at Nelson College
Academic staff of the University of Auckland
Inorganic chemists